Saddle Mountain is a section of New Creek Mountain in the Ridge and Valley physiographic province of the Appalachian Mountains in Mineral County, West Virginia. The mountain is so named for its shape. It is best viewed from Skyline which is located to the west along US 50 at the intersection with WV 42, atop the Allegheny Front.

References

Landmarks in West Virginia
Landforms of Mineral County, West Virginia
Northwestern Turnpike
Mountains of West Virginia